The Museo Arqueológico Municipal de Jerez de la Frontera is an archaeological museum on the Plaza del Mercado in Jerez de la Frontera, province of Cádiz, southern Spain. The museum occupies an 18th-century building which was declared Bien de Interés Cultural in 1962.

It was established in 1873 as the Municipal Archaeological Collection, merging collections donated by wealthy individuals, and based at the Old City Hall of Jerez de la Frontera.  The museum opened to the public in 1935. The collection includes a Corinthian helmet, extremely rare in Spain, found near the city's Charterhouse by the river Guadalete. The collection also includes Roman ceramics and other items.

See also 
 List of museums in Spain

References

External links

 Página Oficial del Museo.
 Vídeo divulgativo
Patrimonio Cultural de Jerez
 Fotos de las principales piezas del Museo
 Museo Arqueológico Municipal de Jerez de la Frontera at Google Cultural Institute
 Donan al Museo Arqueológico una Virgen de piedra del siglo XVII

Archaeological museums in Spain
Buildings and structures in Jerez de la Frontera
Bien de Interés Cultural landmarks in the Province of Cádiz
Museums in Andalusia
Local museums in Spain